Rutilio Benzoni (1542–1613) was a Roman Catholic prelate who served as Bishop of Recanati e Loreto (1592–1613) and Bishop of Loreto (1586–1592).

Biography
Rutilio Benzoni was born in 1542.
On 16 Dec 1586, he was appointed during the papacy of Pope Sixtus V as Bishop of Loreto.
On 28 Dec 1586, he was consecrated bishop by Decio Azzolini (seniore), Bishop of Cervia, with Giulio Ricci, Bishop of Teramo, and Vincenzo Casali, Bishop of Massa Marittima, serving as co-consecrators. 
On 9 Feb 1592, he was named as Bishop of Recanati e Loreto after the diocese was merged with the Diocese of Recanati.
He served as Bishop of Recanati e Loreto until his death on 31 Jan 1613.

While bishop, he was the principal co-consecrator of Marcello Crescenzi, Bishop of Assisi (1591); and Paolo Emilio Sfondrati, Bishop of Cremona (1607).

References

External links and additional sources
 (for Chronology of Bishops) 
 (for Chronology of Bishops)  
 (for Chronology of Bishops) 
 (for Chronology of Bishops) 

16th-century Italian Roman Catholic bishops
17th-century Italian Roman Catholic bishops
Bishops appointed by Pope Sixtus V
1542 births
1613 deaths